Ophioglossum azoricum, the small adder's-tongue fern or lesser adder's-tongue fern, is a small fern of the family Ophioglossaceae.

Distribution 
Ophioglossum azoricum is an Atlantic–Mediterranean species native to islands in the northern Atlantic Ocean and adjacent western and southwestern Europe from Greenland, Iceland and the British Isles in the north, to Macaronesia and the Iberian Peninsula in the south. It also occurs in the Toscana region of Italy, Poland, the Czech Republic, and east to Cyprus, Turkey and Lebanon.

This species mostly occurs on bare or shortly vegetated ground on exposed coastal clifftops. An exception to this habitat preference is populations in the New Forest, Hampshire, where plants occur in tightly grazed damp grassland in a non-maritime setting.

In Iceland and Greenland, it is restricted to geothermal areas where higher temperatures allow its survival.  This species is on the Icelandic list of endangered species.

Description 
The frond of Ophioglossum azoricum consists of a single, pointed leaf blade and a narrow pointed spore-bearing spike on a stalk. The spike has about 4–18 segments on each side, each of which opens up when ripe to release spores. The sterile blades are broadest near the middle and taper towards both ends.

Taxonomy
This taxon is sometimes treated as a subspecies of Ophioglossum vulgatum, as Ophioglossum vulgatum ssp. ambiguum (Coss. & Germ.) E.F. Warburg.

This species is thought to be derived from a hybrid between Ophioglossum vulgatum and Ophioglossum lusitanicum.

This species has a chromosome number of 2n=c.480.

References

External links
BSBI map: Distribution of Ophioglossum azoricum in the British Isles
 "The Ferns (Filicopsida) of the British Isles" — Ophioglossum azoricum — by L. Watson and M. J. Dallwitz.
 West Highland Flora: species account for 'Ophioglossum azoricum

azoricum
Flora of Southwestern Europe
Flora of the Azores
Flora of Greenland
Flora of Iceland
Flora of Ireland
Flora of Italy
Flora of Great Britain
Plants described in 1845
Taxobox binomials not recognized by IUCN